Puerto Rico Highway 162 (PR-162) is a road that travels from Aibonito, Puerto Rico to Barranquitas. This highway begins at its intersection with PR-1 in Cuyón and ends at its junction with PR-156 in downtown Barranquitas.

Major intersections

See also

 List of highways numbered 162

References

External links
 

162